The 1966–67 Cupa României was the 29th edition of Romania's most prestigious football cup competition.

The title was won by Steaua București against Foresta Fălticeni.

Format
The competition is an annual knockout tournament.

In the first round proper, two pots were made, first pot with Divizia A teams and other teams till 16 and the second pot with the rest of teams qualified in this phase. Each tie is played as a single leg.

First round proper matches are played on the ground of the lowest ranked team, then from the second round proper the matches are played on a neutral location.

In the first round proper, if a match is drawn after 90 minutes, the game goes in extra time, and if the scored is still tight after 120 minutes, the team who played away will qualify.

From the second round proper, if a match is drawn after 90 minutes, the game goes in extra time, and if the scored is still tight after 120 minutes, then the younger team (the lower average of players age) will qualify.

From the first edition, the teams from Divizia A entered in competition in sixteen finals, rule which remained till today.

First round proper

|colspan=3 style="background-color:#FFCCCC;"|5 March 1967

|-
|colspan=3 style="background-color:#FFCCCC;"|29 March 1967

|}

Second round proper

|colspan=3 style="background-color:#FFCCCC;"|5 April 1967

|}

Quarter-finals 

|colspan=3 style="background-color:#FFCCCC;"|3 May 1967

|}

Semi-finals

|colspan=3 style="background-color:#FFCCCC;"|28 June 1967

|}

Final

References

External links
 romaniansoccer.ro
 Official site
 The Romanian Cup on the FRF's official site

Cupa României seasons
Cupa Romaniei
Romania